The  was a two-row, 14-cylinder air-cooled radial engine used in a number of combat aircraft of the Imperial Japanese Navy and Imperial Japanese Army before and during World War II.

Design and development
The engine was designed by Nakajima Aircraft Company with code name NAM, as a scaled-down and advanced version of the previous NAL design (Army Type 97 850 hp radial engine, Nakajima Ha5). The Imperial Japanese Army Air Force called the first of the series the Ha25 (ハ25) and later versions were designated Ha105 and Ha115, in the Hatsudoki designation system and Ha-35 in the unified designation system, while the Imperial Japanese Navy Air Service designation was Nakajima NK1, with sub-types identified by Model numbers; thus Nakajima NK1 Sakae 10, 20 and 30 series.

A total of 21,166 were made by Nakajima; 9,067 were manufactured by other firms.

Variants
Army Type 99 975 hp Air-cooled Radial 
Long Army designation for the Nakajima NK1 radial engine named Sakae.
Nakajima Ha25 (Hatsudoki designation)
Short Army designation for the initial production version of the Nakajima NK1 radial engine named Sakae.
Nakajima Ha105 (Hatsudoki designation)
Nakajima Ha115 (Hatsudoki designation)
Nakajima Ha115-I
Nakajima Ha115-II
Nakajima Ha-35 (unified designation)
Nakajima Ha-35 Model 11
Nakajima Ha-35 Model 12
Nakajima Ha-35 Model 23 - 1,150 hp (858 kW)

Nakajima NK1 (Navy designation)
NK1C Sakae 12 - 925 hp (690 kW), 940 hp (701 kW), 975 hp (727 kW)
NK1D Sakae 11 - 970 hp (723 kW), 985 hp (735 kW)
NK1F Sakae 21 - 1,115 hp (831 kW), 1,130 hp (843 kW)
NK1E Sakae 31 - 1,130 hp (843 kW), boosted to 1,210 hp (902 kW) with water-methanol injection

Applications
Kawasaki Ki-45 (prototype)
Kawasaki Ki-48
Kawasaki Ki-56
Mitsubishi A6M
Mitsubishi C5M2
Nakajima B5N2
Nakajima J1N
Nakajima Ki-43
Nakajima Ki-115
Tachikawa Ki-77

Surviving engines
A small number of original Sakae powerplants are on display in aviation museums, usually mounted into the airframes of restored Mitsubishi A6M Zeros. Only one airworthy Zero worldwide still flies with a restored Sakae powerplant, the Planes of Fame Museum's A6M5 example, bearing tail number "61-120".

Specifications (Sakae 21)

See also

References

Notes

Bibliography

Gunston, Bill. World Encyclopedia of Aero Engines. Cambridge, England. Patrick Stephens Limited, 1989. 
Jane's Fighting Aircraft of World War II. London. Studio Editions Ltd, 1989. 
 Peattie, Mark R., Sunburst: The Rise of Japanese Naval Air Power 1909-1941, Annapolis, Maryland: Naval Institute Press, 2001,

External links

Aircraft air-cooled radial piston engines
1930s aircraft piston engines
Nakajima aircraft engines